Harold Putnam (born February 15, 1916) was a Republican member of the Massachusetts House of Representatives from Needham, Massachusetts, representing the 6th Norfolk District. He was born in Boston and educated at Boston Latin School and Dartmouth College and worked as a journalist. He was a member of the Massachusetts House from 1949 to at least 1954. He was married to, and then divorced from, Glendora Putnam.

See also
 Massachusetts legislature: 1949–1950, 1951–1952, 1953–1954, 1955–1956

References

Politicians from Needham, Massachusetts
Members of the Massachusetts House of Representatives
1916 births
Year of death missing